Pimpinella monoica is now listed as a synonym for Pimpinella wallichiana (Miq.) Gandhi  a plant species belonging to the genus Pimpinella.

Distribution 
The plant is endemic to India.

Chemistry 
Furanochromones, like pimolin, can be found in P. monoica. The plant is found to contain the furocoumarin isopimpenellin and five biogenetically related furocoumarins viz khellin, visnagin, visamminol, ammiol and khellol.

References

External links 
 Pimpinella monoica on zipcodezoo.com

monoica
Taxa named by Nicol Alexander Dalzell
Flora of India (region)